Tapoa I (1772–1812) was the king of the Tahitian island of Bora Bora from 1778 to 1812.

Ancestry

References 

1772 births
1812 deaths
French Polynesian royalty
Oceanian monarchs
People from Bora Bora